Balangoda is a large town in Ratnapura District, Sabaragamuwa Province, Sri Lanka, governed by an urban council located  away from Colombo and  from Ratnapura on Colombo - Batticaloa Highway(A4). It is one of the largest towns of the Sabaragamuwa Province.

Balangoda is notable due to the discovery of skeletal Hominini remains from the late Quaternary period (the earliest reliably dated record of anatomically modern humans in South Asia). The town is also the birthplace of Balangoda Ananda Maitreya Thero and Sirimavo Bandaranaike (the world's first female head of government) the Prime Minister of Sri Lanka (1960–65, 1970–77 and 1994–2000).

Balangoda is situated in the hilly central region of central Sri Lanka on Sabaragamuwa Mountain Range. The main livelihoods of this region are farming (vegetables, fruits, and spices), rice cultivation for mainly local consumption, tea cultivation for international markets as a commercial crop and gem mining.

Education

Universities
Sabaragamuwa University of Sri Lanka

Schools
The main schools in the area are:
 Balangoda Ananda Maithreya National School
 Vidyaloka Central College
 R/B/C.C.Tamil Maha Vidyalyam
 Meddakanda Maha Vidyalaya
 Jeilani Central College
 Sri Buddha Jayanthi Central College
Sri Shariputhra Maha Vidyalaya (The school is located in Imbulpe Divisional Secretariat which is adjoining to Balangoda Divisional Secretariat.)
 St Agnes Balika Maha Vidyalaya (St. Agnes Convent)
 Udagama Maha Vidyalaya
 Walagamba Maha Vidyalaya-Weligepola

See also 
Balangoda Man

References

Populated places in Sabaragamuwa Province